The Law West of Tombstone is a 1938 Western film. It was an early Western for Tim Holt.

Plot
A Judge Roy Bean figure dispenses justice in Arizona. He teams up with the Tonto Kid to fight the McQuinn gang.

Cast
 Harry Carey as Bill Barker
 Tim Holt as Ted aka The Tonto Kid
 Evelyn Brent as Clara 'Clary' Martinez
 Jean Rouverol as Nita Mosby
 Clarence Kolb as Sam Kent
 Allan Lane as Danny Sanders
 Esther Muir as Madame Mustache
 Bradley Page as Doc Howard
 Paul Guilfoyle as Bud McQuinn
 Robert Spindola as Joey Chuy (as Robert Moya)
 Ward Bond as Mulligan P. Martinez
 George Irving as Mort Dixon

Production
Tim Holt was borrowed by RKO from Walter Wanger to play the Tonto Kid. He would soon star in a series of Westerns for the studio.

Anne Shirley and Harry Carey were also borrowed from Wanger. However Shirley refused to play the role and was suspended.

Author Tom Stempel called the film " one of the more haphazard movies of the time" in which "Carey plays a combination of Buffalo Bill, Judge Roy Bean, and Pat Garrett, with a young Holt playing a version of Billy the Kid. Holt seems right at home in westerns."

References

External links
 
 
 
 

1938 films
1938 Western (genre) films
American Western (genre) films
Films set in Arizona
American black-and-white films
Films produced by Cliff Reid
Films directed by Glenn Tryon
RKO Pictures films
1930s American films
1930s English-language films